School District of Washington is the public school district headquartered in Washington, Missouri.

Schools
Secondary schools:
Washington High School
Washington Middle School

Elementary schools:
Augusta Elementary School
Campbellton Elementary School
Clearview Elementary School
Labadie Elementary School
Marthasville Elementary School
South Point Elementary School
Washington West Elementary School

Preschool:
Early Learning Center

Alternative:
Four Rivers Career Center

References

External links
 

Education in Franklin County, Missouri
School districts in Missouri